The Aragonese nationalism is a political movement that searches for greater autonomy or even the independence of Aragon. Its principles are based on the idea that Aragon is a historical nationality with its own history, language, laws and culture.

Political parties and organizations 
There are several political parties and organizations self-defined as nationalist or regionalist in Aragon:
Chunta Aragonesista (CHA), leftist nationalist political party
Puyalón de Cuchas, leftist separatist political party
 Aragonese Party, rightist regionalist political party
Compromiso con Aragón, moderate regionalist political party 
Estau Aragonés, leftist nationalist political party

See also 

 Nationalisms and regionalisms of Spain